János Spisák (born 23 September 1961) is a Hungarian biathlete. He competed in the 20 km individual event at the 1984 Winter Olympics.

References

1961 births
Living people
Hungarian male biathletes
Olympic biathletes of Hungary
Biathletes at the 1984 Winter Olympics
Sportspeople from Miskolc